Sergey Ivanovich Taramaev (born 8 October 1958) is a Russian film and theatrical actor and film director. He won Russian Guild of Film Critics award.

Selected filmography 
Actor
 1995 Small Demon as Peredonov
 1995 A Moslem as  Holy Father Mikhail
 2007 1612 
 2008 The Inhabited Island as Ketshev
 2010 Fortress of War 
 2011 Dostoevsky (TV Mini-Series) as Mikhail Dostoevsky, Fyodor brother 
 2013 Winter Journey as Slava
Director
 2013 Winter Journey'' with Lyubov Lvova

References

External links

1958 births
Living people
Russian male film actors
Russian male stage actors
Russian film directors
Honored Artists of the Russian Federation
Russian Academy of Theatre Arts alumni